Duhun is a rural council located in Darchula District of Sudurpashchim province in Nepal. 

The rural council was formed on 10 March 2017, when Government of Nepal announced 753 local level units as per the new constitution of Nepal 2015.  thus the rural municipality came into existence. The rural council was formed merging following former VDCs: Hikila, Pipalchauri and Dhari. Some part (Ward No. 1, 2 & 3 of Previous Api Municipality was also merged in this rural council, remaining wards of Api municipality was merged in Mahakali Municipality) The rural council is divided into 5 wards and the admin center of the rural council is located at Hikila (ward no. 2)

References

Darchula District
Rural municipalities in Darchula District
Rural municipalities of Nepal established in 2017